The Lottery and Other Stories is a 1949 short story collection by American author Shirley Jackson. Published by Farrar, Straus, it includes "The Lottery" and 24 other stories. This was the only collection of her stories to appear during her lifetime. Her later posthumous collections were Come Along with Me (Viking, 1968), edited by Stanley Edgar Hyman, and Just an Ordinary Day (Bantam, 1995) and Let Me Tell You (Random House, 2015), edited by her children Laurence Jackson Hyman and Sarah Hyman Stewart.

Jackson's original title for this collection was The Lottery or, The Adventures of James Harris.  Characters named James Harris appear in the stories "The Daemon Lover," "Like Mother Used to Make," "Elizabeth" and "Of Course."  Other characters with the surname Harris appear or are referenced in "The Villager," "The Renegade," "Flower Garden," "A Fine Old Firm" and "Seven Types of Ambiguity." The collection also contains a short excerpt from the traditional ballad "The Daemon Lover," in which the title character's name is James Harris.

The book bears the dedication "For my mother and father".

Contents
The second, third, and fourth sections are prefaced by quotations from Saducismus Triumphatus, a 17th century book about witchcraft, by Joseph Glanvill.

I
"The Intoxicated"
"The Daemon Lover"
"Like Mother Used to Make"
"Trial by Combat"
"The Villager"
"My Life with R. H. Macy"
II
"The Witch"
"The Renegade"
"After You, My Dear Alphonse"
"Charles"
"Afternoon in Linen"
"Flower Garden"
"Dorothy and My Grandmother and the Sailors"
III
"Colloquy"
"Elizabeth"
"A Fine Old Firm"
"The Dummy"
"Seven Types of Ambiguity"
"Come Dance with Me in Ireland"
IV
"Of Course"
"Pillar of Salt"
"Men with Their Big Shoes"
"The Tooth"
"Got a Letter from Jimmy"
"The Lottery"
V
"Epilogue"

Reception
Anthony Boucher and J. Francis McComas praised the volume as "a brilliant collection of naturalistic glimpses of a world with terrifying holes in it."

Reappraising the book in 2011 for The Guardian, Stephanie Cross wrote:

See also

"The Daemon Lover"
Macy's
Alphonse and Gaston
Seven Types of Ambiguity

References

1949 short story collections
Short story collections by Shirley Jackson
Farrar, Straus and Giroux books